Wendell Krinn Technical High School is a four-year public technical high school in New Port Richey, Florida, on the Gulf of Mexico. It is part of the Pasco County Public School System in Pasco County, Florida. The school opened on August 13, 2018, using the campus of the old Ridgewood High School, which closed in May, 2018. It is named for the first principal of Ridgewood High School.

The school will operate as a magnet school, drawing students from throughout Pasco County. They may earn college credits and have career training while obtaining their high school diploma. Specialized courses will include cyber security and BioMedical.

References

High schools in Pasco County, Florida
Public high schools in Florida
Educational institutions established in 2018
New Port Richey, Florida
2018 establishments in Florida